Shandong Subdistrict is a subdistrict in Shapingba District, Chongqing, China. , it has 2 residential communities under its administration: Shandong and Linyuan.

See also 
 List of township-level divisions of Chongqing

References 

Township-level divisions of Chongqing
Shapingba District